Frederick Joseph "Cy" Alberts (January 14, 1882 – August 27, 1917) was a Major League Baseball pitcher who played in  with the St. Louis Cardinals. He batted and threw right-handed. Alberts had a 1–2 record, with a 6.18 ERA, in four games, in his one-year career.

He was born in Grand Rapids, Michigan and died in Fort Wayne, Indiana.

External links

1882 births
1917 deaths
Major League Baseball pitchers
Baseball players from Grand Rapids, Michigan
St. Louis Cardinals players
Fort Wayne Railroaders players
Canton Red Stockings players
Springfield Babes (baseball) players
South Bend Greens players
Terre Haute Stags players
Terre Haute Miners players
Sacramento Sacts players
Terre Haute Terre-iers players